The Mandau-class, Indonesian designation KCR-PSK, is a class of four missile-armed fast attack craft that currently operated by the Indonesian Navy. They were built by the Korea Tacoma Marine Industries from South Korea between 1977 to 1980.

Design 
In 1975, Indonesia placed an order with the South Korean shipbuilder, Korea Tacoma International, for 4 PSK Mark 5 missile armed fast attack craft. The design was based on Korea Tacoma's PSSM patrol boat built for the Republic of Korea Navy, which in turn was based on the  built for the US Navy.

Displacement is  standard and  full load. The ships's machinery is arranged in a 2-shaft, Combined Diesel or Gas (CODOG) layout, with a single General Electric-Fiat LM2500 gas turbine rated at  powering the ship at high speeds, with two MTU 12V331 TC81 diesel engines rated at  each, power the ship at lower speeds. Maximum speed is  using the gas turbine, and  using the diesels.

The ships are fitted with a single Bofors 57 mm SAK-57 Mk I gun forward, with a Bofors 40 mm L/70 gun aft, with two Rheinmetall 20 mm cannon providing close-in defence. Four mm 38 Exocet anti-ship missiles can be carried. The ships have a crew of 7 officers and 36 other ranks.

A Racal Decca 1226 I-band surface search radar is fitted, while fire control is by a Signaal WM 28 fire control radar and a Selenia NA-18 optronic director.

Operational history
On September 11, 2018, KRI Rencong caught fire and sank while on patrol near Sorong in West Papua. The incident occurred at around 7 a.m. when a fire broke out in the ship's engine room after the gas turbine unexpectedly shut down. The fire soon spread to other compartments, including the ammunition room, prompting the ship's commander to issue an order to abandon ship. The patrol boat has been instrumental in Indonesia's efforts to root out illegal fishing since 2015. The ship used to intercept mainly Philippine and Taiwanese fishing boats entering and fishing illegally in Indonesian waters. It formed part of the Indonesian Navy's Third Fleet Command in Sorong and used to patrol the Banda Sea in the Maluku Islands and the Celebes Sea east of Sulawesi Island.

Ships

See also
List of active Indonesian Navy ships

Equipment of the Indonesian Navy

References

Bibliography

Fast attack craft of the Indonesian Navy
Ships built in South Korea
Missile boat classes